Tenmusu, also spelled as ten-musu, is a dish in Japanese cuisine that consists of a rice ball wrapped with nori that is filled with deep-fried tempura shrimp. Tenmusu is sometimes included as a food in bento boxes.

History
Tenmusu originated in the Mie prefecture region of Japan. In contemporary times, it is regarded as a specialty dish of Nagoya, located in the Chūbu region of Japan, and is a part of Nagoya cuisine.

See also
 List of Japanese dishes
 List of rice dishes
 List of shrimp dishes
 Onigiri

References

External links

 Tenmusu Recipe. Japanese Cooking 101.

Japanese cuisine
Japanese rice dishes
Shrimp dishes